March 17 - Eastern Orthodox liturgical calendar - March 19

All fixed commemorations below are observed on March 31 by Orthodox Churches on the Old Calendar.

For March 18th, Orthodox Churches on the Old Calendar commemorate the Saints listed on March 5.

Saints

 The 10,000 Martyrs of Nicomedia (Myriads of Holy Martyrs), by the sword.
 Martyrs Trophimus and Eucarpion, soldiers, at Nicomedia (300)
 Saint Cyril of Jerusalem, Archbishop of Jerusalem (386)
 Venerable Ananias the Wonderworker (Aninas of the Euphrates), Hieromonk.  (see also: March 16)
 Saint Daniel, monk of Egypt (6th century)

Pre-Schism Western saints

 Saints Narcissus and Felix, a Bishop and his Deacon honoured as martyrs in the city of Girona in Catalonia, Spain (c. 307)
 Saint Tetricus, Bishop of Langres in Gaul (572)
 Saint Frediano (Frigidanus, Frigdianus), an Irish prince and hermit, and Bishop of Lucca (588)
 Saint Egbert of Ripon (729).
 Saint Edward the Martyr, King of England (978)  (see also: February 13 - translation; June 20 - uncovering)

Post-Schism Orthodox saints

 Saint Cyril of Astrakhan (1576)

New martyrs and confessors

 New Hieromartyr Demetrius Rozanov, Priest (1938)
 Virgin-martyr Natalia Baklanova (1938)
 Saint Maria Skobtsova (Elizabeth Pilenko), nun, who suffered at Ravensbrück concentration camp (1945)

Other commemorations

 Repose of Abbot Mark of Optina Monastery (1909)
 Repose of St. Nicholas of Zhicha, at Libertyville, Illinois (1956)

Gallery

Notes

References

Sources
 March 18/March 31. Orthodox Calendar (PRAVOSLAVIE.RU).
 March 31 / March 18. HOLY TRINITY RUSSIAN ORTHODOX CHURCH (A parish of the Patriarchate of Moscow).
 March 18. OCA - The Lives of the Saints.
 The Autonomous Orthodox Metropolia of Western Europe and the Americas (ROCOR). St. Hilarion Calendar of Saints for the year of our Lord 2004. St. Hilarion Press (Austin, TX). p. 22.
 March 18. Latin Saints of the Orthodox Patriarchate of Rome.
 The Roman Martyrology. Transl. by the Archbishop of Baltimore. Last Edition, According to the Copy Printed at Rome in 1914. Revised Edition, with the Imprimatur of His Eminence Cardinal Gibbons. Baltimore: John Murphy Company, 1916. pp. 79–80.
Greek Sources
 Great Synaxaristes:  18 ΜΑΡΤΙΟΥ. ΜΕΓΑΣ ΣΥΝΑΞΑΡΙΣΤΗΣ.
  Συναξαριστής. 18 Μαρτίου. ECCLESIA.GR. (H ΕΚΚΛΗΣΙΑ ΤΗΣ ΕΛΛΑΔΟΣ). 
Russian Sources
  31 марта (18 марта). Православная Энциклопедия под редакцией Патриарха Московского и всея Руси Кирилла (электронная версия). (Orthodox Encyclopedia - Pravenc.ru).
  18 марта (ст.ст.) 31 марта 2013 (нов. ст.). Русская Православная Церковь Отдел внешних церковных связей. (DECR).

March in the Eastern Orthodox calendar